The Taft Cardinals were a minor league baseball franchise based in Taft, Texas in 1938. Taft played as members of the Class D level Texas Valley League in their only season of minor league play.

History
The Taft Cardinals began minor league play in the 1938 Texas Valley League. After a nine-season hiatus, the 1938 Texas Valley League reformed as a six–team Class D level league, with the Brownsville Charros, Corpus Christi Spudders, Harlingen Hubs, McAllen Packers and Refugio Oilers joining Taft as the league members.

In their opening game, Taft was defeated by the Brownsville Charros by the score of 8–5.

After beginning league play on April 14, 1938, the Cardinals finished the season in 3rd place, qualifying for the Texas Valley League playoffs, in their only season of play. Taft finished the 1938 regular season with a record of 68–67, playing under managers Leroy "Cowboy" Jones and John Morrow. Taft finished 23.5 games behind the 1st place Corpus Christi Spudders in the final regular season standings. In the 1938 playoffs, the Cardinals lost in 1st round, as the Harlingen Hubs swept Taft in three games.

Future major league players made an impact for Taft, as Jack Creel led Taft with a 15–7 record and Fats Dantonio hit .324 in 349 at bats for the 1938 Cardinals.

Following the 1938 season, the Texas Valley League permanently folded. Taft, Texas has not hosted another minor league team.

St. Louis Cardinals non–affiliation
While the 1938 Taft Cardinals franchise is not referenced as being an official affiliate of the St. Louis Cardinals, the Taft roster was filled almost exclusively with St. Louis Cardinals' affiliate players and the franchise used the corresponding moniker. On March 23, 1938, the St. Louis Cardinals were fined for having multiple minor league team affiliates in certain leagues and 74 Cardinal minor league players were declared free agents in the ruling by baseball commissioner Kenesaw Mountain Landis. The Cardinals and minor league teams involved were also fined for not notifying Landis of existing "working agreements". Taft player Jack Creel was future St Louis Cardinals player and was channeled in 1939 with Fats Dantonio from Taft to the St. Louis Cardinals' affiliate New Iberia Cardinals. Taft Cardinals player Charles Flash played for St. Louis Cardinals' affiliates in both 1937 and 1939 and numerous other Taft teammates had played for 1937 Cardinals' affiliates before joining the Taft roster. Nearly all other 1938 Taft Cardinal players who continued to play minor league baseball in 1939, continued their careers with 1939 St. Louis Cardinals' affiliate teams. Manager John Morrow went on to manage the Johnson City Cardinals, who were a St. Louis Cardinals affiliate.

The ballpark
The Taft Cardinals were noted to have played minor league home games at the Taft High School Field. In 1938, the ballpark had a capacity of 1,200 and dimensions of (Left, Center, Right): 315–390–315. Today, Taft High School is located at 502 Rincon Road, Taft, Texas.

Year–by–year records

Notable alumni
Jack Creel (1938)
Fats Dantonio (1938)

See also
Taft Cardinals players

References

External links
Baseball Reference

Defunct minor league baseball teams
Professional baseball teams in Texas
Defunct baseball teams in Texas
Baseball teams established in 1938
Baseball teams disestablished in 1938
Texas Valley League teams
San Patricio County, Texas